Sergei Petrovich Mogilnikov (born September 28, 1958) is a former Soviet and Kazakhstani professional  ice hockey player and currently an ice hockey coach. He is the former head coach of Gornyak Rudny, Barys Astana, Kazakhmys Satpaev and Kazzinc-Torpedo.

Career
Sergei Mogilnikov played the most of his career years for Torpedo Ust-Kamenogorsk and stayed there until 1988. In 1988, he joined to Avtomobilist Karagandy. 1992, he signed a contract with Metallurg Magnitogorsk and played 4 years for them. He has competed at the IIHF World Championship Division II with Team Kazakhstan in 1993. He ended his professional career in 1995-96 season. In 1997, he started his coaching career as an assistant coach of Kazakhstan men's national ice hockey team. In 1998 Winter Olympics, he was an assistant of Boris Alexandrov at the Team Kazakhstan's coaching staff. They reached a quarter final, when they lost to Team Canada. In 2002, he promoted Kazakhstan U18 National Team to World Championships elite division.

Coaching career
1997–2001 Kazakhstan U20 National Team – assistant coach
2001–2002 Kazakhstan U18 National Team – head coach
2002–2003 Barys Astana – head coach
2003–2007 Gornyak Rudny – head coach
2007 Barys Astana – head coach
2008–2009 Kazakhmys Satpaev – head coach
2010–2012 Gornyak Rudny – head coach
2012 Kazzinc-Torpedo – head coach

References

External links

1958 births
Sportspeople from Oskemen
Avtomobilist Karagandy players
Barys Astana head coaches
Metallurg Magnitogorsk players
Kazakhstani ice hockey forwards
Kazakhstani ice hockey coaches
Kazzinc-Torpedo players
Soviet ice hockey forwards
Asian Games gold medalists for Kazakhstan
Medalists at the 1996 Asian Winter Games
Asian Games medalists in ice hockey
Ice hockey players at the 1996 Asian Winter Games
Living people